C69 or C-69 may refer to:

 Bill C-69, a 2019 act of the Parliament of Canada
 Caldwell 69, a planetary nebula
 Eye neoplasm
 , a County-class heavy cruisers of the Royal Navy
 Lockheed C-69 Constellation, an American transport aircraft
 London Underground C69 and C77 Stock, rolling stock used from 1970 to 2014
 Ruy Lopez, Exchange Variation, a chess opening